The Syracuse–West Virginia football rivalry is an American college football rivalry between the Syracuse Orange football team of Syracuse University and West Virginia Mountaineers football team of West Virginia University.

History
The Ben Schwartzwalder Trophy is the trophy that went annually to the winner of the game. It was introduced in 1993 and is named after former WVU football player and Syracuse head coach Ben Schwartzwalder, who died in April of that year. It was sculpted by Syracuse player Jim Ridlon.

West Virginia won the first trophy game 43–0 at Syracuse and has gone on to win 11. Syracuse has won the trophy eight times and leads the series 34–27. With West Virginia's move to the Big 12 Conference in 2012 and Syracuse's move to the Atlantic Coast Conference in 2013, the future of the series is in doubt with no meetings currently planned.

The two teams met in the 2012 Pinstripe Bowl and 2018 Camping World Bowl, which Syracuse won 38–14 and 34–18 respectively. However, the trophy was not exchanged.

Game results

See also  
 List of NCAA college football rivalry games

References

College football rivalries in the United States
Syracuse Orange football
West Virginia Mountaineers football